Slaves in Bondage is a 1937 American crime drama film directed by Elmer Clifton and starring Lona Andre, Donald Reed, and Wheeler Oakman.

Plot summary 
The film tells the tale of how naive country girls are lured to the big city with the promise of employment only to be abducted and forced to work as prostitutes in decadent, high-class brothels.

Cast 
Lona Andre as Dona Lee
Donald Reed as Phillip Miller
Wheeler Oakman as Jim Murray
Florence Dudley as Belle Harris
John Merton as Nick Costello
Richard Cramer as Dutch Hendricks
William Royle as Newspaper City Editor
Edward Peil Sr. as Detective Captain
Louise Small as Mary Lou Smith
Matty Roubert as Good-Looking Freddie
Suzanna Kim as Fan Dancer

Ed Carey, Martha Chapin, Donald Kerr, Eddie Laughton, Sam Lufkin, Murdock MacQuarrie, Carl Mathews, Fred Parker, Henry Roquemore, Lottie Smith, and Arthur Thalasso appears uncredited.

Production background
Slaves in Bondage is a low-budget, independently produced exploitation film presented as a cautionary tale about the evils of white slavery prostitution rings operating in larger cities in the United States. To avoid local censorship issues, the film's dialogue does not use the words brothel or prostitution.

The film is typical of the many exploitation film features of its time that claimed to warn the public about various kinds of shocking sin and depravity corrupting today's society. In reality, these films were cynical, profit-motivated vehicles that wallowed in lurid, taboo subjects such as drug abuse, promiscuous sex, venereal disease, polygamy, child marriages, etc.

External links 

1937 crime drama films
1937 films
American black-and-white films
American crime drama films
1930s English-language films
Films directed by Elmer Clifton
1930s American films